Gaylord Graves (May 22, 1804 – August 29, 1889) was a member of the Wisconsin State Assembly.

Biography
Graves was born on May 22, 1804 in Richfield Springs, New York. On June 18, 1824, he married Nancy Tuckerman. They would have five children before her death on January 5, 1845. On March 15, 1848, Graves married Keziah Freeman. She died the following spring. His last wife was Mary Ann.

Graves moved to East Troy, Wisconsin Territory in 1836. In 1855, Graves moved to Iowa and settled near Des Moines. In 1859, Graves settled in Emmet County, Iowa. He died on August 29, 1889 in Northwood, Iowa.

Career
Graves was a member of the 1st Wisconsin Legislature in 1848. Previously, he had been a member of the Wisconsin Territorial Legislature in the Wisconsin Territorial House of Representatives in 1846. Other positions Graves held include town supervisor and Walworth County, Wisconsin supervisor. He was a Democrat.

References

External links

The Political Graveyard

People from Richfield Springs, New York
People from East Troy, Wisconsin
Democratic Party members of the Wisconsin State Assembly
Members of the Wisconsin Territorial Legislature
County supervisors in Wisconsin
Wisconsin city council members
1804 births
1889 deaths
19th-century American politicians
People from Emmet County, Iowa